Amagasaki Station (尼崎駅) may refer to:
Amagasaki Station (JR West)
Amagasaki Station (Hanshin)